Bordasia is a genus of flowering plants belonging to the family Malvaceae.

Its native range is Paraguay.

Species:

Bordasia bicornis

References

Malvaceae
Malvaceae genera